Anthem of the Bulgarian People's Republic, also unofficially known as Dear Bulgaria was the national anthem of Bulgaria from 1951 until 1964.

History 
On February 20, 1949, a contest for the new anthem of the Bulgarian People's Republic was announced. According to the requirements of the organizers, it should in a simple, tight and exciting form reflect the most characteristic of the historical development of the Bulgarian people. The text should be simple, clear and smooth, "as inspirational, as wise as poetic as it is political." In its content, the heroic struggles of the Bulgarian people for liberation, the majestic and unexpected glories of Hristo Botev and Vasil Levski, as well as the other fighters fallen for freedom, have to be emphasized. It is explicitly emphasized that reflection was to find the Ninth of September as the beginning of a new era. Reflection requirements are to show "the love of the people to the homeland, the praise of its beauty, its determination to fight, to work affectionately for its glory and prosperity, its readiness for all sacrifices for freedom and independence, and friendship with the Soviet Union."

In March 1949, a special commission reviewed the submitted proposals. Thirty-one proposals were picked to be published in the periodic press for a nationwide discussion. The proposals was published on March 23, 1949.
Among the authors were Elisaveta Bagryana, Mladen Isaev, Ivan Rudnykov, Nikolay Marangozov, Aleksandar Gerov, Mihail Lakatnik. According to the commission, none of these poems meet all the requirements, which is why the poets Bagryana, Isaev and Nikola Furnadzhiev were assigned to compose a final version. The work proceeded until May 18, 1950, when the text was finally ready and approved by the Council of Ministers. The next day, the Committee on Science, Art and Culture announced a contest for the creation of a melody. On December 30, 1950, the Presidium of the National Assembly issued Decree No. 688, which came into force on January 1, 1951, which affirmed the song as the new anthem of the People's Republic of Bulgaria.

The lyrics of the 1951 anthem closely resembled the State Anthem of the Soviet Union, and is entirely written according to the canons of Stalin's times. The rejection of the cult of personality of Stalin and attempts to democratize the Soviet system in the early 1960s led to the discourse of the replacement of the anthem. This prompted poet Georgi Dzhagarov to begin an effort to replace the anthem. His polemic reached Todor Zhivkov, leader of the People's Republic of Bulgaria, and soon, Zhivkov held a dialog with Dzagarov about the replacement of the anthem. On March 29, 1962, the Council of Ministers of Bulgaria announced a competition for writing of texts and music, with the deadline for the submission of the project on May 1, 1963. This resulted in the "Balgariyo mila" anthem being relinquished, and Mila Rodino was affirmed as the new national anthem on September 8, 1964.

Lyrics

Similarity to the anthem of the Soviet Union 
The lyrics of the anthem was entirely written according to the music of Stalin's times. The melody and the lyrics of the anthem were heavily influenced by the State Anthem of the Soviet Union. A brief comparison of the translation of both of the anthem proves this :

Orchestral sheet music of the anthem

References 

Bulgarian patriotic songs
European anthems